"For the Night" is a song by American singer Chlöe featuring American rapper Latto. It was released as a single on October 28, 2022, through Parkwood Entertainment and Columbia Records.

Background and release 
Chlöe first previewed the song on May 18, during an Instagram Live along with tracks "Surprise" and "Cheat Back". The release of "For the Night" follows Chlöe's cover of "Freak Like Me" by Adina Howard. On September 24, 2022, she debuted the song at the 2022 iHeartRadio Music Festival. The singer revealed that it would feature Latto on October 24.

Composition 
"For the Night" was produced by London on da Track. On October 1, during a Twitter Space, she revealed to fans that the song was written about American rapper and collaborator Gunna.

Music video 
American comedian Druski co-stars in the song's music video alongside Chlöe. The singer shared a teaser of the video on October 18.

Charts

References 

2022 singles
2022 songs
Chloe Bailey songs
Columbia Records singles
Latto songs
Song recordings produced by London on da Track
Songs written by Chloe Bailey
Songs written by Latto
Songs written by London on da Track
Songs written by Nija Charles